Additive combinatorics is an area of combinatorics in mathematics. In the case of the integers, the classical Freiman's theorem provides a partial answer to this question in terms of multi-dimensional arithmetic progressions.

Examples of this type include the Erdős–Heilbronn Conjecture (for a restricted sumset) and the Cauchy–Davenport Theorem. The methods used for tackling such questions often come from many different fields of mathematics, including combinatorics, ergodic theory, analysis, graph theory, group theory, and linear algebraic and polynomial methods.

History of additive combinatorics 
Although additive combinatorics is a fairly new branch of combinatorics (in fact the term additive combinatorics was coined by Terence Tao and Van H. Vu in their book in 2000's), an extremely old problem Cauchy–Davenport theorem is one of the most fundamental results in this field.

Cauchy–Davenport theorem 
Suppose that A and B are finite subsets of the prime order cyclic group  for a prime , then the following inequality holds.

Vosper's theorem 
Vosper's theorem answers this question. Suppose that  (that is, barring edge cases) and 

Plünnecke–Ruzsa inequality 
A useful theorem in additive combinatorics is Plünnecke–Ruzsa inequality. For instance using Plünnecke–Ruzsa inequality, we are able to prove a version of Freiman's Theorem in finite fields.

Basic notions

Operations on sets 
Let A and B be finite subsets of an abelian group, then the sum set is defined to be

For example, we can write . Similarly we can define the difference set of A and B to be

Here we provide other useful notations.

Not to be confused with

Doubling constant 
Let A be a subset of an abelian group. The doubling constant measures how big the sum set  is compared to its original size |A|. We define the doubling constant of A to be

Ruzsa distance 
Let A and B be two subsets of an abelian group. We define the Ruzsa distance between these two sets to be the quantity

Ruzsa triangle inequality
tells us that the Ruzsa distance obeys the triangle inequality:

However, since  cannot be zero, note that the Ruzsa distance is not actually a metric.

References

Citations

 Tao, T., & Vu, V. (2012). Additive combinatorics. Cambridge: Cambridge University Press.
 Green, B. (2009, January 15). Additive Combinatorics Book Review. Retrieved from https://www.ams.org/journals/bull/2009-46-03/S0273-0979-09-01231-2/S0273-0979-09-01231-2.pdf.

 
Mathematical theorems
Combinatorial algorithms